Gamfexine (WIN-1,344) is a centrally acting stimulant drug, which was tested as an adjunct treatment for withdrawn patients with schizophrenia, but while effective for treating withdrawal it made psychotic symptoms worse.

See also
Delucemine

References 

Stimulants
Dimethylamino compounds